Frederick John Webber (28 April 1883 – 7 September 1966) was an Australian rules footballer in the Victorian Football League (VFL).

Webber made his debut for the Carlton Football Club in Round 8 of the 1902 season. He left the Blues at the end of the 1904 season.

External links

Fred Webber at Blueseum

1883 births
Carlton Football Club players
Australian rules footballers from Melbourne
Australian military personnel of World War I
1966 deaths
People from Abbotsford, Victoria
Military personnel from Melbourne